Ray William Welker (born April 19, 1939) is an American politician in the state of Minnesota. He served in the Minnesota House of Representatives.

References

1939 births
Living people
Republican Party members of the Minnesota House of Representatives